Lewis Black's Root of All Evil is an American television series that premiered on March 12, 2008, on Comedy Central and was hosted by comedian Lewis Black. The series was produced by Scott Carter and written by David Sacks. Sometimes there were pre-recorded video segments directed by supervising producer Michael Addis.

Lewis Black's Root of All Evil is formatted as a tongue-in-cheek mock trial acted in deadpan. Black presided over two opposing guest comedians championing a person or thing as the "root of all evil" (YouTube, beer, Oprah Winfrey, PETA, etc.).
The series ended on October 1, 2008, with a total of 18 episodes. The series' cancellation was confirmed by Lewis Black in September 2009. The entire first season of Lewis Black's Root of All Evil was released on DVD in the United States on September 30, 2008. The remaining episodes from season two are not currently available on DVD.

Format
Each show followed the same format: Black welcomed the viewer to his courtroom and announced the two Evil candidates for the Root of All Evil. Black gave a brief history of each of the Evils and introduced the two advocates, who presented their oral arguments why their Evil is the greater. Black began his inquisition, questioning the advocates about their Evils. Usually, the answers pointed out the good or usefulness of the opponent's Evil or the greater evil of their own. Black asked the advocates to predict what would happen if their Evil continued to spread. The Ripple of Evils used absurd, comedic logic and were generally very silly. After the advocates gave their closing arguments, Black asked for the audience's opinion, which he seldom followed, and announced his verdict and the loser's sentence.

Advocates
The advocates were not the same every week, but six of the eight appeared multiple times. The advocates and their Win/Loss records are:

 *No winner was declared in "Red States vs. Blue States". Instead, Black declared that the Root of All Evil was Puerto Rico.  Therefore, the results were not counted in the Advocates' Win/Lose column.  However, the audience poll declared Red States the Root of All Evil, which was counted in the Audience Poll columns.

Episodes

Season 1 (2008)

Season 2 (2008)
Season two was dedicated to the memory of George Carlin, who died on June 22, 2008 due to a heart failure; but a dedication message did not appear until the end of "Olympic Games vs. Drinking Games" on August 13, 2008.

Reception
Even before the first episode was broadcast, Brian Lowry in Variety attacked the show, saying that the guest comedians were "second-tier" and that the set "resembles a cut-rate version of The Weakest Link set" and that "Comedy Central's programming usually falls squarely into the sublime or the ridiculous, so consider Root of All Evil a rare tweener in terms of quality—one that proves a whole lot of Black is preferable, albeit marginally, to a black hole." Attracting about 2.3 million viewers, the debut episode was the most-watched premiere episode of a Comedy Central series since the premiere of Chappelle's Show in 2003 and topped the demographics for male audiences ages 18 to 34.

Mark Dawidziak of The Plain Dealer wrote in his review, "I'm a sucker for a good Lewis rant, and sometimes Root of All Evil would benefit from more Lewis fomenting and less formula. For as long as it's around, though, it does make a good fit with a Comedy Central lineup that includes Jon Stewart, Stephen Colbert, Sarah Silverman and, of course, South Park."

The 3rd Annual Independent Investigative Group IIG Awards presented an award to Root of All Evil recognizing the promotion of science and critical thinking in popular media on May 18, 2009.

Cancellation
While there was no official notice from Comedy Central, Lewis Black stated in a September 2009 interview that "the show is dead".

Home media
The entire first season of Lewis Black's Root of All Evil was released on two disc DVD set in the United States on September 30, 2008. All episodes are available on iTunes.

See also 
The Debaters - CBC comedy debate show

References

External links 
 
Comedy Central picks up Lewis Black's Root of All Evil pilot
Lewis Black's New Pilot Picked Up Here
Comedy Central Gets Angry With Lewis Black

2000s American comedy television series
2008 American television series debuts
2008 American television series endings
Comedy Central original programming
English-language television shows